Tumbinai Khan, Tumbinai Setsen Khan, or, Timurids say Tumanay Khan (Mongol: Тумбинай хаан, Тумбинай сэцэн, Туманай хаан; died 1130 CE.) was the Khan of the Borjigin Imperial Mongol tribe, He lived during the 11th and 12th centuries, His son and successor Khabul Khan was the founder of the Khamag Mongol after his death, His second son Khaduli agreed with his brother Khabul Khan, Tumbinai was a great-great-grandfather of Genghis Khan founder of the Mongol empire, through his eldest son Khabul Khan and the great-great-great-great-great-great-grandfather of Amir Timur, who was the founder of the Timurid empire at Central Asia, through his second son Khaduli through his great-grandson Qarachar Barlas, who created the Barlas confederacy clan, He was the son and successor of Baishinkhur Dogshin who was the son of Kaidu Khan.

Life 
He born around 11th century AD. At this time the Mongol reach was rapidly growing. The Liao dynasty of China always threatened the Mongols, so he paid tribute to the emperor. After his death his eldest son Khabul Khan succeeded him and united the Mongol tribes, forming a Khamag Mongol Confederacy and becoming the first Khan of Mongol. Khabul fought and defeated Liao's forces. he is the great-great-great-great-grandson of Bodonchar Munkhag who made the foundation of the Borjigin clan and lived in the 10th century. Munkhag's other famous descendent great-great-grandson Qarachar Noyan created the Barlas Mongol confederacy clan, who became Regent Minister of Chagatai khanate.

References 

1130 deaths
Tengrist monarchs
12th-century Mongol rulers
1130s deaths